The Metropolitan City of Turin (Piedmontese: Sità metropolitan-a 'd Turin) is a metropolitan city in the Piedmont region, Italy. Its capital is the city of Turin. It replaced the Province of Turin and comprises the city of Turin and 311 other municipalities (comuni). It was created by the reform of local authorities (Law 142/1990) and established by the Law 56/2014. It has been officially operating since 1 January 2015.

The Metropolitan City of Turin is headed by the metropolitan mayor (sindaco metropolitano) and by the metropolitan council (consiglio metropolitano). Since 5 June 2016, Chiara Appendino has served as the mayor of the capital city, succeeding Piero Fassino. The largest Metropolitan City of Italy, it is the only one to border a foreign state, France.

Metropolitan area
There are 312 comuni in the metropolitan area – the most of any province or metropolitan city in Italy. The province with the second highest number of comuni is Cuneo with 250.

Geography
The territory consists of a mountainous area to the west and north along the border with France and with the Valle d'Aosta, and part that is flat or hilly in the south and east. The mountainous part is home to part of the Hautes Alpes, the Graian Alps and, to a much lesser extent, the Pennine Alps. The highest point in the Metropolitan City of Turin is the Roc (4,026 m), located in the Gran Paradiso massif on the border with Valle d'Aosta.

Several wildlife reserves are located in the province, including the Sacro Monte Natural Reserve in Belmonte and the Gran Paradiso National Park. The Residences of the House of Savoy, located in Turin and several other towns in the province, as well as the Sacro Monte of Belmonte, are UNESCO World Heritage Sites.

Transport

The Metropolitan City has a large number of rail and road work sites. Although this activity increased when the city was chosen to host the 2006 Winter Olympics, parts of it had long been planned. Some of the work sites deal with general roadworks to improve traffic flow, such as underpasses and flyovers.

Two projects are of major importance and will radically change the shape of the city of Turin. One is the Spina Centrale ("Central Spine") project, which includes the doubling of a major railway crossing the city, the Turin-Milan railway locally known as Passante Ferroviario di Torino ("Turin Railway Bypass"). The railroad previously ran in a trench. This is to covered by a major boulevard running from North to South of Turin, in a central position along the city. Porta Susa, on this section, will become Turin's main station to substitute the terminus of Porta Nuova with a through station. Other important stations are Stura, Rebaudengo, Lingotto and Madonna di Campagna railway stations, though not all of them belong to the layout of the Spina Centrale.

The other major project is the construction of a subway line based on the VAL system, known as Metrotorino. This project is expected to continue for years and to cover a larger part of the city. Its first phase was finished in time for the 2006 Olympic Games, inaugurated on 4 February 2006 and opened to the public the day after. The first leg of the subway system linked the nearby town of Collegno with Porta Susa in Turin's city centre. On 4 October 2007 the line was extended to Porta Nuova. In March 2011 it reached Lingotto. A new extension of the so-called Linea 1 ("Line 1") is expected in the near future, reaching both Rivoli (up to Cascine Vica hamlet) in the Western belt of Turin and Piazza Bengasi in the Southeast side of the city. In addition, a Linea 2 is in the pipeline, and it is supposed to cross Turin from North to South.

It is connected to the city by a railway service (from Dora Station) and a bus service (from Porta Nuova and Porta Susa railway stations).

As of 2010 also a bicycle sharing system, the ToBike, is operational.

The metropolitan area is served by Turin metropolitan railway service.

Government

List of Metropolitan Mayors of Turin

Metropolitan Council
The new Metro municipalities, giving large urban areas the administrative powers of a province, are conceived for improving the performance of local administrations and to slash local spending by better coordinating the municipalities in providing basic services (including transport, school and social programs) and environment protection. In this policy framework, the Mayor of Turin is designated to exercise the functions of Metropolitan mayor, presiding over a Metropolitan Council formed by 18 mayors of municipalities within the Metro municipality.

The first Metropolitan Council of the City was elected on 12 October 2014:

Municipalities
There are 118 municipalities (comuni, singular: comune) in the metropolitan city. the largest by population are:

See also 

 Shroud of Turin
 House of Savoy
 Italian language
 Piedmontese language
 Franco-Provençal language
 Residences of the Royal House of Savoy
 Parco Nazionale del Gran Paradiso

References

 
Turin